Urbanna Creek is a  long 3rd order tributary to the Rappahannock River in Middlesex County, Virginia.  The stream is tidal is for its entire distance.

Variant names
According to the Geographic Names Information System, it has also been known historically as:  
Nimcock Creek
Urbana Creek

Course
Urbanna Creek begins at the Town Bridge Pond dam about 0.5 miles southwest of Urbanna, Virginia.  Urbanna Creek then flows southeast then northeast to meet the Rappahannock River at Urbanna, Virginia.

Watershed
Urbanna Creek drains  of area, receives about 45.8 in/year of precipitation, has a topographic wetness index of 432.65 and is about 54.8% forested.

Maps

See also
List of rivers of Virginia

References

External links
 Urbanna, Virginia
 Town of Urbanna, Virginia

Bodies of water of Middlesex County, Virginia
Rivers of Virginia
Tributaries of the Chesapeake Bay